The qualifying round of the 2002–03 UEFA Cup was contested from 13 to 29 August 2002. A total of 82 teams participated in this round, which decided 41 of the 96 places in the first round.

Format
In the qualifying round, each tie was played over two legs, with each team playing one leg at home. The team that scored more goals on aggregate over the two legs advanced to the next round. If the aggregate score was level, the away goals rule was applied, i.e., the team that scored more goals away from home over the two legs advanced. If away goals were also equal, then thirty minutes of extra time were played, divided into two fifteen-minute halves. The away goals rule was again applied after extra time, i.e., if there were goals scored during extra time and the aggregate score was still level, the visiting team advanced by virtue of more away goals scored. If no goals were scored during extra time, the tie was decided by penalty shoot-out.

Teams
A total of 82 teams from 44 national associations were involved in the qualifying round, including three teams that qualified via the Fair Play ranking (FP).

Below are the participating teams, sorted by their 2002 UEFA club coefficient (in parentheses).

 Ipswich TownFP (32.729)
 Hapoel Tel Aviv (26.666)
 Copenhagen (24.687)
 Servette (24.312)
 Varteks (22.520)
 Wisła Kraków (21.750)
 Red Star Belgrade (18.165)
 Sigma OlomoucFP (17.312)
 IFK Göteborg (16.620)
 Amica Wronki (15.750)
 Maccabi Tel Aviv (15.666)
 Zenit Saint Petersburg (14.645)
 Litex Lovech (14.582)
 CSKA Sofia (14.582)
 Viktoria Žižkov (14.312) 
 Leixões (14.124)
 BrannFP (13.737)
 Hajduk Split (13.520)
 Aberdeen (13.062)
 Livingston (13.062)
 Metalurh Zaporizhya (12.979)
 Mouscron (12.762)
 Stabæk (12.737)
 Kärnten (12.625)
 AIK (12.620)
 Lugano (11.312)
 HJK Helsinki (11.020)
 Rapid București (10.958)
 Ferencváros (9.874)
 Primorje (8.916)
 Matador Púchov (8.832)
 Polonia Warsaw (8.750)
 Midtjylland (8.687)
 Odense (8.687)
 Djurgården (8.620)
 Sartid (8.165)
 Újpest (7.874)
 Koba Senec (7.832)
 Anorthosis Famagusta (7.666)
 Național București (6.958)
 Dinamo Tbilisi (6.499)
 Gorica (5.916)
 AEL Limassol (4.666)
 Liepājas Metalurgs (4.582)
 MyPa-47 (4.020)
 Ventspils (3.582)
 Zimbru Chișinău (3.582)
 Locomotive Tbilisi (3.499)
 Nistru Otaci (2.582)
 Fylkir (2.416)
 ÍBV Vestmannaeyjar (2.416)
 Birkirkara (2.249)
 Dinamo Minsk (2.041)
 Gomel (2.041)
 Atlantas (1.915)
 Sūduva Marijampolė (1.915)
 Dundalk (1.665)
 Shamrock Rovers (1.665)
 Pobeda (1.498)
 Belasica (1.498)
 Sliema Wanderers (1.249)
 Bangor City (0.916)
 Total Network Solutions (0.916)
 TVMK Tallinn (0.832)
 Levadia Tallinn (0.832)
 Zvartnots Yerevan (0.666)
 Spartak Yerevan (0.666)
 Sarajevo (0.666)
 Široki Brijeg (0.666)
 Linfield (0.665)
 Glentoran (0.665)
 KÍ Klaksvík (0.582)
 GÍ Gøta (0.582)
 Tirana (0.582)
 Partizani (0.582)
 Vaduz (0.500)
 Avenir Beggen (0.416)
 Grevenmacher (0.416)
 Domagnano (0.000)
 Encamp (0.000)
 Kairat Almaty (0.000)
 Atyrau (0.000)

Seeding
The draw was held on 21 June 2002 in Geneva. Before the draw, teams were divided into seeded and unseeded teams, based on their UEFA club coefficients at the beginning of the season. For convenience of the draw and to avoid pairing of teams from the same association, the teams were further divided into 10 groups (nine groups of eight teams and one group of ten teams), each containing an equal number of seeded and unseeded teams.
In the draw, a seeded team from each group was paired with an unseeded team from the same group. The first team to be drawn played the first leg at home.

Summary
The first leg matches were played on 13 and 15 August, and the second leg matches were played on 29 August 2002.

|}

Matches

Litex Lovech won 8–1 on aggregate.

Zenit Saint Petersburg won 13–0 on aggregate.

Matador Púchov won 2–0 on aggregate.

Wisła Kraków won 6–0 on aggregate.

Midtjylland won 3–2 on aggregate.

Primorje won 6–3 on aggregate.

Ventspils won 3–1 on aggregate.

Hapoel Tel Aviv won 5–1 on aggregate.

Ferencváros won 5–2 on aggregate.

Hajduk Split won 11–0 on aggregate.

Sūduva Marijampolė won 6–4 on aggregate.

Amica Wronki won 12–2 on aggregate.

Copenhagen won 7–2 on aggregate.

Kärnten won 6–2 on aggregate.

1–1 on aggregate. Livingston won on away goals.

Polonia Warsaw won 5–1 on aggregate.

Anorthosis Famagusta won 3–2 on aggregate.

Maccabi Tel Aviv won 3–2 on aggregate.

Leixões won 4–3 on aggregate.

2–2 on aggregate. Sarajevo won 5–3 on penalties.

Zimbru Chișinău won 5–3 on aggregate.

Újpest won 3–2 on aggregate.

Odense won 2–1 on aggregate.

CSKA Sofia won 5–1 on aggregate.

Dinamo Tbilisi won 5–1 on aggregate.

Servette won 5–0 on aggregate.

Djurgårdens won 5–1 on aggregate.

Varteks won 9–0 on aggregate.

Gomel won 5–0 on aggregate.

Aberdeen won 1–0 on aggregate.

AIK won 5–1 on aggregate.

Rapid București won 5–1 on aggregate.

Viktoria Žižkov won 5–0 on aggregate.

Red Star Belgrade won 5–0 on aggregate.

Metalurh Zaporizhya won 5–0 on aggregate.

Sartid won 2–1 on aggregate.

Široki Brijeg won 5–1 on aggregate.

National București won 3–2 on aggregate.

Ipswich Town won 9–1 on aggregate.

Mouscron won 4–2 on aggregate.

Stabæk won 5–1 on aggregate.

Notes

References

Qualifying round